Phillips Raymond Holmes (July 22, 1907 – August 12, 1942) was an American actor. For his contributions to the film industry, he was posthumously given a star on the Hollywood Walk of Fame in 1960.

Early life, education and career
Born in Grand Rapids, Michigan, the son of Edna Phillips and stage star Taylor Holmes, Holmes enjoyed a privileged childhood and received his education at Trinity College, Cambridge, the University of Grenoble and a year at Princeton University where he was spotted in the undergraduate crowd during the filming of Frank Tuttle's Varsity in 1928 and offered a screen test. In the early 1930s, he became a popular leading man, playing leads in a few important productions, notably in Josef von Sternberg's An American Tragedy (1931) and Ernst Lubitsch's Broken Lullaby (1932).

At Paramount, he starred in melodrama and comedy. In 1933, his contract with Paramount ran out and he moved to MGM for one year. As the decade progressed, Holmes' career declined, and he appeared in a few box-office failures, including Sam Goldwyn's poorly received Nana (1934). His last American movie was General Spanky (1936). In 1938, he appeared in two UK movies. Housemaster was his last film, and he returned to acting on stage in the United States.

Scandal
In 1933, Holmes was driving with actress Mae Clarke when he crashed into a parked car. Clarke dropped the suit when Holmes agreed to pay her medical expenses. The changes in her face adversely affected her burgeoning career in the long run (in 1931, she had played both Victor Frankenstein's bride in Frankenstein and was the recipient of half a grapefruit in the face from James Cagney in The Public Enemy).

Military service and death
At the start of World War II, he joined the Royal Canadian Air Force. He was killed in a mid-air collision in northwest Ontario, Canada.

Legacy
Holmes has a star on the Hollywood Walk of Fame.

Filmography

Uneasy Money (1918) as Caddy (film debut, uncredited)
Her Market Value (1925) as Party Boy (uncredited)
Varsity (1928) as Middlebrook
His Private Life (1928) as Pierrot (uncredited)
The Wild Party (1929) as Phil
The Studio Murder Mystery (1929) as Young Actor (uncredited)
Stairs of Sand (1929) as Adam Wansfell
Illusion (1929) as Eric's Friend in Audience (uncredited)
The Return of Sherlock Holmes (1929) as Roger Longmore
Pointed Heels (1929) as Donald Ogden
Only the Brave (1930) as Capt. Robert Darrington
Paramount on Parade (1930) as Hunter - Episode 'Dream Girl'
The Devil's Holiday (1930) as David Stone
Grumpy (1930) as Ernest Heron
Her Man (1930) as Dan Keefe
The Dancers (1930) as Tony
Man to Man (1930) as Michael Bolton
The Criminal Code (1931) as Robert Graham
Stolen Heaven (1931) as Joe Bartlett
Confessions of a Co-Ed (1931) as Dan Carter
An American Tragedy (1931) as Clyde Griffiths
Two Kinds of Women (1932) as Joseph Gresham Jr.
Broken Lullaby (1932) as Paul Renard
Night Court (1932) as Mike Thomas
Make Me a Star (1932) as Phillips Holmes (uncredited)
70,000 Witnesses (1932) as Buck Buchan
The Secret of Madame Blanche (1933) as Leonard St. John
Men Must Fight (1933) as Bob Seward
Looking Forward (1933) as Michael Service
Storm at Daybreak (1933) as Csaholyi
The Big Brain (1933) as Terry Van Sloan
Dinner at Eight (1933) as Ernest DeGraff
Beauty for Sale (1933) as Burt Barton
Penthouse (1933) as Tom Siddall
Stage Mother (1933) as Lord Aylesworth
Nana (1934) as Lieutenant George Muffat
Caravan (1934) as Lt. von Tokay
Private Scandal (1934) as Cliff Barry
Million Dollar Ransom (1934) as Stanton Casserly
No Ransom (1934) as Tom Wilson
Great Expectations (1934) as Pip
Ten Minute Alibi (1935) as Colin Derwent
The Divine Spark (1935) as Vincenzo Bellini
Chatterbox (1936) as Philip 'Phil' Greene Jr
The House of a Thousand Candles (1936) as Tony Carleton
General Spanky (1936) as Marshall Valient
The Dominant Sex (1937) as Dick Shale
Housemaster (1938) - Philip de Pourville

See also

 List of alumni of Trinity College, Cambridge
 List of people from Grand Rapids, Michigan
 List of Princeton University people
 Lists of actors

References

External links

 
 
 Photographs of Phillips Holmes

1907 births
1942 deaths
20th-century American male actors
Accidental deaths in Ontario
Alumni of Trinity College, Cambridge
American expatriate male actors in Canada
American expatriate male actors in France
American expatriate male actors in the United Kingdom
American expatriates in England
American male film actors
Burials at Gate of Heaven Cemetery (Hawthorne, New York)
Canadian military personnel killed in World War II
Male actors from Grand Rapids, Michigan
Princeton University alumni
Military personnel from Michigan
Royal Canadian Air Force personnel of World War II
Grenoble Alpes University alumni
Victims of aviation accidents or incidents in Canada
Victims of aviation accidents or incidents in 1942
Royal Canadian Air Force airmen